The 1989 Ebel German Open was a men's tennis tournament that was part of the Super Series of the 1989 Nabisco Grand Prix circuit. It was the 80th edition of the event and was played on outdoor clay courts at the Am Rothenbaum in Hamburg, West Germany from 8 May until 15 May 1989. The final was postponed to Monday, 15 May due to rain during the weekend. First-seeded Ivan Lendl won the singles title, his second at the event after 1987, and earned $135,000 first-prize money.

Last year's singles winner, Swede Kent Carlsson, was eliminated early this time in the second round. The Czechoslovakian Ivan Lendl won the final against the Austrian Horst Skoff in three sets (the final was played in the best-of-five). The defending doubles champions Darren Cahill and Laurie Warder did not compete again in doubles . Cahill didn't play doubles at all and Warder was eliminated in the quarterfinals. It was won by the Spanish pair of brothers Emilio Sánchez Vicario and Javier Sánchez .

Finals

Singles
 Ivan Lendl defeated  Horst Skoff 6–4, 6–1, 6–3
 It was Lendl's 5th singles title of the year and the 78th of his career.

Doubles
 Emilio Sánchez /  Javier Sánchez defeated  Boris Becker /  Eric Jelen 6–4, 6–1

References

External links
 
 ATP tournament profile
 ITF tournament editions details

German Open
Hamburg European Open
1989 in West German sport
German